This is a list of United States attorneys appointed by the 46th president of the United States, Joe Biden.

, President Biden has nominated 68 people to be U.S. attorneys: 63 of the nominations were confirmed by the U.S. Senate, 2 are being considered by the Senate, 1 was withdrawn after Senate confirmation, and 2 others were withdrawn before Senate action. There are a total of 93 U.S. attorneys in the Department of Justice.

Color key 
 Denotes appointees awaiting Senate confirmation.

 Denotes appointees serving in an acting or interim capacity.

 Denotes appointees who have left office or offices which have been disbanded.

Appointments

Withdrawn nominations

See also 
Cabinet of Joe Biden, for the vetting process undergone by top-level roles including advice and consent by the Senate
Department of Justice appointments by Joe Biden

References

Notes 

Confirmations by roll call vote

Confirmations by voice vote

External links 

U.S. Attorneys Office

2020s politics-related lists
Lists of American politicians
Biden administration personnel
Joe Biden-related lists